Pink Floyd World Tour 1968 was a Pink Floyd world tour spanning February to December 1968 in which the group visited Europe and North America.

History 
The tour began with difficulty as the band's lead guitarist, vocalist and primary songwriter Syd Barrett left the band in April 1968. Despite leaving in April, Barrett had only played in the band in January this year, when they were briefly a five-piece with the addition of guitarist David Gilmour, but he soon replaced Barrett entirely. As the main frontman, Barrett had initially been a central part of live performances, although bassist Roger Waters was able to steer the band through a potentially difficult series of live concerts based mainly on the European mainland. Many of these performances took place at multi-artist music festivals in Europe, although the band were starting to establish a successful university circuit around the UK. In these venues, the band were greeted with respect and during some performances the audience would remain silent until the last note was played.

The tour began on 17 February at the Patronaatsgebouw, Netherlands and ran until a final performance in the Netherlands on 28 December. The tour was fitted in and around recording commitments and the band did not perform consistently during this period.

After Barrett's departure, many of his songs were gradually dropped from the band's set lists, but some compositions that the band had performed with Barrett remained in their repertoire until 1971, notably "Interstellar Overdrive" and "Astronomy Domine". The latter track was doubled in length with an additional organ solo and repeated verses. "Set the Controls for the Heart of the Sun" had been performed in late 1967 with Barrett, but the band increasingly extended it to feature more guitar and organ work. This song would be played at almost every Pink Floyd concert until 1972. In 1968, a large gong also became a characteristic part of the band's live show following its introduction at the "Games for May" concert in 1967.

"Careful with That Axe, Eugene", which was introduced in early 1968 under the titles "Murderistic Women" and "Keep Smiling People", would develop into a major part of the band's live shows up until 1973. The song was gradually extended as the year progressed, with initial performances lasting only four minutes and then growing to reach 8 minutes and more. At the latter end of 1968, Waters' vocalizations and climactic screams became a focal point of this piece.

Another increasingly regular addition to Pink Floyd performances was "The Massed Gadgets of Hercules": an early, shorter version of "A Saucerful of Secrets". Like "Eugene", the song was gradually extended from 6 minutes up until around 11 minutes as Gilmour took the wordless vocal on the closing "Celestial Voices" section of the song.

Tour dates

Set list 
A typical set list would include some of the following:
 "Astronomy Domine"
 "Interstellar Overdrive"
 "Set the Controls for the Heart of the Sun"
 "Pow R. Toc H."
 "Let There Be More Light"
 "The Massed Gadgets of Hercules" (first performed on 23 May 1968, early title for "A Saucerful of Secrets")
 "Flaming"
 "Keep Smiling People" (an embryonic version of "Careful with That Axe, Eugene")

Other songs 
 "Remember a Day" (played only once on 6 May 1968)
 "It Would Be So Nice" (played only once on 11 May 1968)
 "Matilda Mother" (played only once on 26 July 1968)

Personnel
David Gilmour – guitars, vocals
Roger Waters – bass, vocals, cymbals on "A Saucerful of Secrets", gong on "Set the Controls for the Heart of the Sun"
Rick Wright – keyboards, vocals
Nick Mason – drums

Additional musicians 
Roy Harper – cymbals on "A Saucerful of Secrets" at Hyde Park 29 June

References 

Brain Damage.co.uk

1968 concert tours
Pink Floyd concert tours